An All-American team is an honorary sports team composed of the best amateur players of a specific season for each team position—who in turn are given the honorific "All-America" and typically referred to as "All-American athletes", or simply "All-Americans". Although the honorees generally do not compete together as a unit, the term is used in U.S. team sports to refer to players who are selected by members of the national media.  Walter Camp selected the first All-America team in the early days of American football in 1889.  The 2019 NCAA Men's Basketball All-Americans are honorary lists that will include All-American selections from the Associated Press (AP), the United States Basketball Writers Association (USBWA), the Sporting News (TSN), and the National Association of Basketball Coaches (NABC) for the 2018–19 NCAA Division I men's basketball season. All selectors choose three teams, while AP also lists honorable mention selections.

The Consensus 2019 College Basketball All-American team was determined by aggregating the results of the four major All-American teams as determined by the National Collegiate Athletic Association (NCAA). Since United Press International was replaced by TSN in 1997, the four major selectors have been the aforementioned ones. AP has been a selector since 1948, NABC since 1957 and USBWA since 1960.  To earn "consensus" status, a player must win honors based on a point system computed from the four different all-America teams. The point system consists of three points for first team, two points for second team and one point for third team. No honorable mention or fourth team or lower are used in the computation. The top five totals plus ties are first team and the next five plus ties are second team.

Although the aforementioned lists are used to determine consensus honors, there are numerous other All-American lists. The ten finalists for the John Wooden Award are described as Wooden All-Americans. The ten finalists for the Senior CLASS Award are described as Senior All-Americans.  Other All-American lists include those determined by USA Today, Fox Sports, Yahoo! Sports and many others. The scholar-athletes selected by College Sports Information Directors of America (CoSIDA) are termed Academic All-Americans.

2019 Consensus All-America team
PG – Point guard
SG – Shooting guard
PF – Power forward
SF – Small forward
C – Center

Individual All-America teams

By player

By team

AP Honorable Mention:

Keith Braxton, Saint Francis (PA)
Ignas Brazdeikis, Michigan
Tookie Brown, Georgia Southern
Chris Clemons, Campbell
R. J. Cole, Howard
Jeremy Combs, Texas Southern
Jarron Cumberland, Cincinnati
Mike Daum, South Dakota State
Jordan Davis, Northern Colorado
Cameron Delaney, Sam Houston State
Lamine Diane, Cal State Northridge
Daniel Gafford, Arkansas
Rapolas Ivanauskas, Colgate
Ty Jerome, Virginia
Cameron Johnson, North Carolina
Jón Axel Guðmundsson, Davidson
Anthony Lamb, Vermont
Fletcher Magee, Wofford
Caleb Martin, Nevada
C. J. Massinburg, Buffalo
Garrison Mathews, Lipscomb
Luke Maye, North Carolina
Drew McDonald, Northern Kentucky
Sam Merrill, Utah State
Jaylen Nowell, Washington
Miye Oni, Yale
Shamorie Ponds, St. John's
Myles Powell, Seton Hall
Admiral Schofield, Tennessee
Marial Shayok, Iowa State
B. J. Stith, Old Dominion
Matisse Thybulle, Washington
Jake Toolson, Utah Valley
Marques Townes, Loyola (IL)
Tremont Waters, LSU
Coby White, North Carolina
Justin Wright-Foreman, Hofstra
Cameron Young, Quinnipiac

Academic All-Americans
On March 11, 2019, the College Sports Information Directors of America (CoSIDA) announced the 2019 Academic All-America team, with Joe Sherburne headlining the NCAA Division I team as the men's college basketball Academic All-American of the Year.  The following is the 2018–19 Academic All-America Division I Men's Basketball Team as selected by CoSIDA:

Senior All-Americans
The ten finalists for the Senior CLASS Award, called Senior All-Americans, were announced on February 8, 2019.
The first and second teams, as well as the award winner, were announced during the lead-in to the Final Four. The overall award winner is indicated in bold type.

First team

Second team

References

All-Americans
NCAA Men's Basketball All-Americans